Bebearia fontaineana is a butterfly in the family Nymphalidae. It is found in Cameroon and the Democratic Republic of the Congo. The habitat consists of wet forests.

Subspecies
Bebearia fontaineana fontaineana (Democratic Republic of the Congo: Sankuru)
Bebearia fontaineana intersecta Hecq, 1990 (Cameroon)
Bebearia fontaineana vinula Hecq, 1987 (eastern Nigeria, western Cameroon)

References

Butterflies described in 1987
fontaineana